Juncus inflexus, the hard rush, is a species of flowering plant in the genus Juncus, native to Europe, Asia and Africa, and introduced in Sri Lanka, Java, Île Amsterdam and Île Saint-Paul, Victoria in Australia, New Zealand, Uruguay, and eastern North America. It is a glycophyte.

Description
J. inflexus is a  rhizomatous tufted perennial usually growing 0.5 – 1m tall. The rigid glaucous stems are thin and wiry, measuring 1 – 2.5 mm in diameter. They are lined with 15 – 20 distinct vertical ridges and filled with interrupted spongy pith. Stomata are arranged along the stem in 5 – 10 rows.

The basal sheaths are a shiny reddish black.

It blooms from late spring until midsummer, producing loose clusters of very small reddish-brown flowers at the top of some stems. These later ripen into brown short-beaked seed capsules.

Habitat and ecology
Generally common in England and Wales, but rarer in Scotland. It grows in open wet places such as springs, marshes, wet pastures, and damp meadows as well as by rivers, ponds, and lakes. It prefers heavy base-rich or neutral soils consolidated by trampling.

Appears to be tolerant of annual mowing and light to moderate grazing. It is unpalatable to cattle and eaten by rabbits probably only when grazing pressure is high.

Subtaxa
The following subspecies are currently accepted:
Juncus inflexus subsp. brachytepalus (Trautv. ex V.I.Krecz. & Gontsch.) Novikov
Juncus inflexus subsp. inflexus

References

inflexus
Taxa named by Carl Linnaeus
Plants described in 1753